Musgum may refer to:

Musgum people
Musgum dwelling units
Musgu language